WZOE-FM (98.1 FM) is a radio station broadcasting a Top 40/CHR format.  Licensed to Princeton, Illinois, United States, the station serves the LaSalle-Peru area.  The station is currently owned by Fletcher Ford, through licensee Virden Broadcasting Corp., and features programming from NBC News Radio.

References

External links

ZOE-FM
Bureau County, Illinois
Contemporary hit radio stations in the United States